Tamanique is a municipality in the La Libertad department of El Salvador, about 17 miles northwest of El Puerto La Libertad. 

Tamanique is known for coffee growing and avocado trees. Its population is 5,000 (including surrounding areas).

Gallery

Municipalities of the La Libertad Department (El Salvador)